Victory at Entebbe is a 1976 American made-for-television action-drama film for broadcast on ABC, directed by Marvin J. Chomsky. The film starred Helmut Berger, Linda Blair, Anthony Hopkins, Burt Lancaster, Elizabeth Taylor, Richard Dreyfuss, and Kirk Douglas. Julius Harris portrayed Idi Amin, following the fatal heart attack suffered by the actor originally cast in the role, Godfrey Cambridge.  The film was theatrically released in Europe.

Victory at Entebbe is based on the actual event Operation Entebbe, the raid on Entebbe Airport (now Entebbe International Airport) in Uganda and the freeing of Israeli hostages on July 4, 1976. It was the first of three films made in the 1970s based on the Entebbe Raid. The other two, Raid on Entebbe (1977) and Operation Thunderbolt (1977) soon followed. A fourth film, Entebbe (titled 7 Days in Entebbe in the U.S.) was released over four decades later in 2018.

Plot
On June 27, 1976, four terrorists belonging to a splinter group of the Popular Front for the Liberation of Palestine under the orders of Wadie Haddad boarded and hijacked an Air France Airbus A300 in Athens, Greece.

With the permission of President Idi Amin (Julius Harris), the terrorists divert the airliner and its hostages to Entebbe Airport in Uganda.  After identifying Israeli passengers, the non-Jewish passengers are freed while a series of demands are made, including the release of 40 Palestinian militants held in Israel, in exchange for the hostages.

The Cabinet of Israel, led by Prime Minister Yitzhak Rabin (Anthony Hopkins), unwilling to give in to terrorist demands, plans a top-secret military raid.

While still negotiating with the terrorists, who now numbered seven individuals, the Israeli military prepared two Lockheed C-130 Hercules transports for the raid. The transports refuelled in Kenya before landing at Entebbe Airport under the cover of darkness. The commandos led by Brigadier General Dan Shomron (Harris Yulin) had to contend with a large armed Ugandan military detachment and used a ruse to overcome the defenses. A black Mercedes limousine had been carried on board and was used to fool sentries that it was the official car which President Amin used on an impromptu visit to the airport.

Nearly complete surprise was achieved but a firefight resulted, ending with all seven terrorists and 45 Ugandan soldiers killed. The hostages were gathered together and most were quickly put on the idling C-130 aircraft. During the raid, one commando (the breach unit commander Yonatan Netanyahu (Richard Dreyfuss), brother of future Prime Minister Benjamin Netanyahu), and three of the hostages died.

With 102 hostages aboard and on their way to freedom, a group of Israeli commandos remained behind to destroy the Ugandan Air Force MiG-17 and MiG-21 fighters to prevent a retaliation. All the survivors of the attack force then joined in flying back to Israel via Nairobi and Sharm El Sheikh.

Cast

In alphabetical order:
 Helmut Berger as Wilfried Böse
 Linda Blair as Chana Vilnofsky
 Kirk Douglas as Hershel Vilnofsky
 Richard Dreyfuss as Col. Yoni Netanyahu
 Helen Hayes as Etta Grossman Wise
 David Groh as Benjamin Wise
 Anthony Hopkins as Yitzhak Rabin
 Burt Lancaster as Shimon Peres
 Elizabeth Taylor as Edra Vilnofsky
 Julius Harris as Idi Amin
 Theodore Bikel as Yakov Shlomo
 Harris Yulin as Gen. Dan Shomron
 Christian Marquand as Captain Dukas
 Jessica Walter as Nomi Haroun
 Stefan Gierasch as Gen. Gur
 David Sheiner as Aaron Olav 
 Severn Darden as Moshe Meyer
 Allan Miller as Nathan Haroun
 Bibi Besch as Brigitte Kuhlmann

Production
Victory at Entebbe was filmed on videotape at Burbank Studios in California and later transferred to film for distribution around the world, giving the film the slightly stilted visual style of a studio-bound TV drama, but with a film-like look, and big Hollywood names in the cast. Shooting on video shortened the production time, allowing the film to be ready for television less than six months after the event that inspired it.

Reception
Although both telefilms Victory at Entebbe and Raid on Entebbe relied on their star-studded casts, neither were able to make much of an impact with audiences (Victory is generally considered the weaker of the two). The portrayal of the heroic Israeli military in Victory at Entebbe, however, led to radical pro-Palestinian terrorists placing bombs in Germany and Italy, alleging that the film was Zionist propaganda.

Victory at Entebbe was recognized at the 29th Primetime Emmy Awards, where screenwriter Ernest Kinoy received an Emmy Award nomination for his teleplay.

See also
 Raid on Entebbe
 Operation Thunderbolt
 7 Days in Entebbe

References

Notes

Citations

Bibliography

 Barron, Colin N. Planes on Film: Ten Favourite Aviation Films. Stirling, UK: Extremis Publishing, 2016. .
 Buford, Kate. Burt Lancaster: An American Life. London: Aurum Press, 2008. .
 Shaw, Tony. Cinematic Terror: A Global History of Terrorism on Film. London: Bloomsbury Academic, 2014. .

External links
 
 

1976 television films
1976 films
ABC network original films
Films about aircraft hijackings
American television films
Films set in Uganda
Films directed by Marvin J. Chomsky
American aviation films
Operation Entebbe
Films about the Israel Defense Forces
Films set in 1976
The Wolper Organization films
Films shot in the United States
American docudrama films
Cultural depictions of Idi Amin
Films about battles and military operations
Films scored by Charles Fox
1970s American films